Alfonso Rendano (5 April 1853 – 10 September 1931) was an Italian pianist and composer. He is mostly renowned for inventing the "third pedal", which augmented the interpretative resources of the piano.

Rendano was born in Cosenza. He was particularly precocious and at the age of ten he was admitted to the Naples Conservatory, where he was noticed by Sigismund Thalberg who sent him to Paris, recommending him to Rossini.

In 1866 he studied under Georges Mathias, Chopin's pupil. For about 15 years, he carried out an intense musical activity; he then devoted himself to teaching, first in Naples, then in Rome.

Rendano wrote the opera Consuelo, successfully staged in Turin and in Germany. He held his last concert at Rome's Teatro Valle in 1925. He died in Rome in 1931.

The main theatre of Cosenza is named after him.

References

1853 births
1931 deaths
People from Cosenza
Italian classical composers
Italian male classical composers
Italian opera composers
Male opera composers
Pupils of Georges Mathias
Italian classical pianists
Male classical pianists
Italian male pianists
19th-century classical pianists
19th-century classical composers
20th-century classical pianists
20th-century classical composers
19th-century Italian composers
20th-century Italian composers
20th-century Italian male musicians
19th-century Italian male musicians